Admiral Black may refer to:

Barry Black (born 1948), U.S. Navy rear admiral
Eugene H. Black III (born c. 1964), U.S. Navy vice admiral
Jeremy Black (Royal Navy officer) (1932–2015), British Royal Navy admiral
Admiral Black, a fictional admiral in the TV series Star Trek